Rocket Lab Launch Complex 1 (also known as Mahia Launch Complex or Spaceport) is a commercial spaceport located close to Ahuriri Point at the southern tip of Māhia Peninsula, on the east coast of New Zealand's North Island. It is owned and operated by private spaceflight company Rocket Lab and supports launches of the company's Electron rocket for CubeSat nanosatellites. The facility officially opened on 26 September 2016 (UTC). With the launch of Electron on 25 May 2017, it became the first private spaceport to host an orbital launch attempt, and the first site in New Zealand to host an orbital launch attempt. With the Electron launch of 21 January 2018, it became the first private spaceport to host a successful orbital launch.

Location 
The spaceport is located close to Ahuriri Point at the southern tip of New Zealand's Māhia Peninsula, in the Hawke's Bay Region of the North Island's east coast. The only road access is a single road leading north from the site. This crosses the isthmus connecting the peninsula with the rest of the North Island before connecting with SH 2 at the settlement of Nūhaka.

Description 
Launch Complex 1 features a  launch platform and tower, a hangar for the Electron rockets, and storage tanks for liquid oxygen and kerosene. During the test phase of launch operations, which began in May 2017, the exclusion zone would likely be an  radius from the pad, and would reduce in size once the site became commercially operational.

History

Site options 
Rocket Lab announced on 1 July 2015 that it had selected Kaitorete Spit in New Zealand's South Island near Canterbury as the site of the launch facility for its Electron rocket, and that it hoped to have construction finished by the end of the year. While the site would not permit equatorial launches due to the presence of Banks Peninsula to the east, it was favourable for Sun-synchronous orbital flights, which the company believed would be of primary interest to its customers. The site was also logistically favourable as the company wanted to build a rocket production facility in nearby Christchurch.

The Māhia Peninsula site at Onenui Station was mentioned in August 2015 as a possible second launch facility. It had first been visited by company officials in April 2015 as part of their initial scouting for launch sites, and were preparing to submit a resource consent application. By mid-October, the application had been approved by the Wairoa District Council and Hawke's Bay Regional Council only seven days after its submission, with the Gisborne Chamber of Commerce and the Eastland Community Trust working with Rocket Lab to support its bid for the Mahia site.

Decision for Mahia 
On 23 November 2015, Rocket Lab stated that the Māhia Peninsula site would be the priority launch facility because of delays in obtaining resource consents for developing at Kaitorete Spit.

While certain authorisations had been obtained for Kaitorete, such as stormwater and air discharge permits from Environment Canterbury, a coastal permit for occupation of the area, and a Department of Conservation permit, the Christchurch City Council had not consented to the development due to an incomplete Cultural Impact Assessment, resulting in no action under Sections 95 and 104 of the Resource Management Act 1991. The company said that efforts would continue to gain consent for a launch pad on Kaitorete Spit due to its logistical superiority and the foreseen need for additional facilities, but that the Mahia site offered superior launch corridor and flight rate opportunities because of its geographical location and relatively sparse air traffic. The Mahia site is licensed for a maximum launch rate of once every 72 hours over a period of 30 years—Rocket Lab believes the actual rate would average once per week—while the Kaitorete site would only have been licensed to launch once per month.

The company broke ground at Mahia in December 2015, and by June 2016 most of the infrastructure work had been completed, including upgrades to roads and internet services, and work was progressing on the electrical, mechanical and communications infrastructure. Rocket Lab signed an agreement with air traffic service provider Airways New Zealand in early September 2016 to develop "special use airspace" and ensure regular flight activity, which the company estimates could be up to 100 launches per year.

The Māhia Peninsula site, named Rocket Lab Launch Complex 1, was officially opened on 26 September 2016 (UTC) in a ceremony presided over by Minister for Economic Development Steven Joyce. It was attended by approximately 240 people, including company employees, local landowners, and then Labour Party leader Andrew Little.

Launch history

Pad A 
On Pad A or LC-1A Rocket Lab carried out the first test flight of its Electron rocket, named "It's a Test", on 25 May 2017 at 04:20 UTC, coming after three delays caused by bad weather during a launch window that extended from 21 May to 1 June.

The second launch from the launch pad was made 21 January 2018 at 01:43 UTC, successfully making it to orbit. The Electron rocket, named "Still Testing", carried a Dove Pioneer satellite for Planet Labs, two Lemur-2 satellites for Spire Global and the Humanity Star.

Pad B 
On 19 December 2019, Rocket Lab announced that they had begun construction on a second pad at LC-1, known as LC-1B to meet increased launch rates. As of April 2020, the construction was expected to be completed by the end of 2020. It was used for the first time to launch the mission "The Owl's Night Continues" for Synspective on 28 February 2022.

See also 

 Rocket Lab Launch Complex 2, a launch complex in the East Coast of USA.

Notes

References

External links 
 Rocket Lab website

Launch Complex 1
Spaceports
Rocket launch sites
Buildings and structures in the Hawke's Bay Region
2016 establishments in New Zealand
Māhia Peninsula